Anthony Frank Kersting (7 November 1916 – 2 September 2008) was a British architectural photographer. His images of British, European, and Middle Eastern architecture also feature urban and village life, landscape, commerce, transport and leisure. He was considered to be the leading architectural photographer of his generation.

Biography
Kersting was born in 37 Frewin Road in Wandsworth, South London and studied at Dulwich College, where he developed an interest in photography.

After leaving Dulwich he worked at the Sloane Square branch of Lloyds Bank. In 1936 the publication in newspapers of his photographs depicting the new Peter Jones department store influenced a change in career. In 1939 he volunteered for the Royal Air Force and, in 1941, was posted to Egypt. After the war Kersting continued to work as a freelance architectural photographer, illustrating books for Batsford, Nikolaus Pevsner's Guides, Arthur Mee's King’s England series, Encyclopedia Britannica as well as working for Country Life and for the National Trust. In 1947, Kersting was elected a Fellow of the Royal Geographical Society and, in 1999, an exhibition of his photographs was held at the Wandsworth Museum.

A.F. Kersting died in 2008 at the age of 91.

Legacy

The complete archive of Kersting's black and white prints, glass and film negatives, and hand-written ledgers is now held in the Conway Library, the architectural photography collection of the Courtauld Institute of Art, an independent college of the University of London.

The 42,000 negatives are being digitised and will be available in the public domain when the project is finished.

Kersting's work includes photographs of:

People and places around the Middle East, including: sites since destroyed by Daesh; Yazidi people in Iraq; Palmyra, Syria; the Hagia Sophia
Religious sites and street scenes in Nepal
Country estates across the UK, including Duncombe Park, and Castle Howard

Research
A talk entitled "A Possible Life of Anthony Kersting" was given by his biographer, Tom Bilson, at Dulwich College on 20 June 2018 as part of the 11th GE Moore Lecture Series.

Publications
The Architecture of Medieval Britain, Colin Platt, with photographs by Anthony Kersting. New Haven; London: Yale University Press, 1990.Architecture in Britain, 1530 to 1830, John Summerson ; with colour photography by A.F. Kersting. New Haven; London: Yale University Press, 1993. British Library General Reference Collection YC.1995.b.1549.Cirencester. A series of illustrations. Photographs by A. F. Kersting, etc. London; New York: B. T. Batsford, 1951. British Library General Reference Collection 010368.t.37.Prospect of London. Photographs by A. F. Kersting. Introduction by Anthony Thorne. London: B. T. Batsford, 1965. British Library General Reference Collection X.802/244.Portrait of Westminster. A selection of photographs by A. F. Kersting with text by L. C. Spaull. London; Amsterdam: B. T. Batsford, 1964. British Library General Reference Collection X.802/48.English Country Houses in Colour. A collection of colour photographs by A. F. Kersting. With an introductory text and notes on the illustrations by R. Dutton., London; printed in the Netherlands : B. T. Batsford, 1958. British Library General Reference Collection 010352.i.53.Dulwich 400. The First Four Hundred Years 1619–2019.'' Edited by Jan Piggott and Nick Black. London: Order of the Governors of Dulwich College, 2019: 90, 101, 107, 170, 185.

References

External links
Antony F. Kersting Archive. Conway Library, Courtauld Institute of Art, London.

1916 births
2008 deaths
20th-century British photographers
People from the London Borough of Wandsworth
Architectural photographers
People educated at Dulwich College
Royal Air Force personnel of World War II
Fellows of the Royal Geographical Society
Photographers from London